Nuno Coelho may refer to:
Nuno André Coelho (born 1986), Portuguese football defender
Nuno Miguel Prata Coelho (born 1987), Portuguese football midfielder